Zainab Balogun-Nwachukwu (born 10 October 1989) is a Nigerian actress, model and television presenter. She began modelling at an early age after being scouted at 16. She has been featured in several international campaigns for different brands. She co-founded The J-ist TV, an online entertainment web-series that highlights African culture and a range of topical issues; the series features interviews involving some of Africa's top personalities.

Balogun works as a television presenter for EbonyLife TV, an entertainment television station, for which she currently co-hosts and produces The Spot, the channel's leading talk show, with Lamide Akintobi. Balogun also appears as a presenter and associate producer on Jumia TV, a teleshopping show.

Early life and career
Balogun was born in London to Nigerian parents, where she was raised with a large extended family, predominantly in Clapham, a district of South West London. She is an Egba, and claims descent from a family from Abeokuta, Ogun State. Due to the nature of her mother's work, she moved around a lot and spent most of her formative years growing up with relatives.

Her secondary school education was obtained at Sacred Heart RC Secondary School. Her interest in the arts began with her regularly taking part in talent shows and school plays. She studied music and eventually went on to join the school choir and later formed an R&B girl group with two friends called Regné (pronounced "reign"). She attended Christ the King Sixth Form College where she completed her A Levels in Law, Psychology, and English Language & Literature. She then attended the University of Kent in Medway where she received a Bachelor of Law degree (LLB).

Balogun worked as a model after being scouted by Premier Models Management at the age of 16. After obtaining her law degree, she began to appear in shows such as BBC One's Material Girl, Bollywood movie Cocktail (2012), and The Charlatans by Ashley Waters. She soon found herself on set with legendary director Christopher Nolan in 2011 for the film The Dark Knight Rises, which she describes as an "unforgettable experience".

Balogun is now a television presenter, who produces and hosts shows for EbonyLife TV, an entertainment television network. She has also produced shows such as EL Now, a daily entertainment news show for the latest in fashion, music and arts. She is currently joined by Ebuka Obi-Uchendu and Lamide Akintobi on The Spot, a daily hang-out talk show.

Personal life
In May 2018 Balogun married Dikko Nwachukwu, founder of Jetwest Airways. The pair were traditionally married on 13 May in Lagos, Nigeria.

Balogun splits her time between London, England, and Lagos, Nigeria.

Filmography

Television

Film

Awards and nominations

See also
 List of Nigerian actors

References

External links

The Spot website

Nigerian female models
21st-century Nigerian actresses
1989 births
Nigerian television personalities
Living people
Nigerian film actresses
Nigerian television actresses
English people of Nigerian descent
English people of Yoruba descent
Yoruba female models
Yoruba women television personalities
Alumni of the University of Kent
Yoruba actresses
Actresses from London
21st-century English women
21st-century English people
British people of Nigerian descent
People from Ogun State
Actresses from Abeokuta
British emigrants to Nigeria
Nigerian film award winners
Nigerian television presenters